S. J. Ramaswamy Mudaliar is an Indian politician and former Member of the Legislative Assembly of Tamil Nadu. He was elected to the Tamil Nadu legislative assembly as a Dravida Munnetra Kazhagam candidate from Arakkonam constituency in 1962 and 1967 elections. He was elected from Sholinghur constituency as an Anna Dravida Munnetra Kazhagamin 1977 election.

References 

Dravida Munnetra Kazhagam politicians
Members of the Tamil Nadu Legislative Assembly
Year of birth missing
Possibly living people